Clifford Simpson (born ) is a former New Zealand middle-distance athlete who represented his country at the 1950 British Empire Games. He also played representative rugby union for South Otago.

Early life
Born in Temuka, Simpson was educated at King's High School in Dunedin, where he played fullback in the school's 1st XV rugby team, and was prominent in athletics, winning the intermediate athletics championship in 1944.

Athletics
Simpson came to national attention when he won the New Zealand under-19 880 yards title, representing Otago, in 1946, recording a time of 2:00.6, and was second in the same event the following year. He went on to win the national senior title over the same distance in 1950; his winning time was 1:54.4.

Simpson competed in the men's 880 yards and 1 mile at the 1950 British Empire Games in Auckland. He placed fourth in his heat of the 880 yards, and progressed to the final, in which he finished sixth in a time of 1:56.0. He ran 4:26.6 to finish sixth in his heat of the 1 mile, and did not advance further.

Rugby union
A fullback, Simpson was a member of the Toko Rugby Football Club in Milton. He played for the South Otago representative rugby union team between at least 1947 and 1950.

Later life
Simpson worked as a stock agent. He moved to the Manawatu in the early 1950s, living first in Feilding, and later at Halcombe.

References

Date of birth missing (living people)
1920s births
Living people
People from Temuka
People educated at King's High School, Dunedin
New Zealand male middle-distance runners
Olympic athletes of New Zealand
Athletes (track and field) at the 1950 British Empire Games
Commonwealth Games competitors for New Zealand
New Zealand rugby union players
Rugby union fullbacks
New Zealand stock and station agents
Sportspeople from Canterbury, New Zealand